Manuel López (died 9 April 1954) was an Argentine boxer. He competed in the men's lightweight event at the 1948 Summer Olympics.

References

Year of birth missing
1954 deaths
Argentine male boxers
Olympic boxers of Argentina
Boxers at the 1948 Summer Olympics
Place of birth missing
Lightweight boxers